Donald R. Smith (November 13, 1926 – February 4, 1982) was an American politician.

Smith graduated from York High School in Elmhurst, Illinois and then joined the United States Navy in 1944 during World War II and served until 1946. He went to Loyola University Chicago and John Marshall Law School In Chicago, Illinois. He served as County Treasurer of DuPage County, Illinois and served on the DuPage County Commission. He was a Republican. From 1965 until 1977, Smith served as chief fiscal officer in the office of the Illinois Treasurer. In 1977, he was appointed Illinois Treasurer when Alan J. Dixon resigned to serve as Illinois Secretary of State. Smith served until 1979.

On February 4, 1982, Smith was found murdered in the Radisson Hotel on North Michigan Avenue. He was strangled. On February 5, 1982, two suspects held for questioning in the death of Smith were released by the police after passing polygraph tests.

Notes

1926 births
1982 deaths
People from Elmhurst, Illinois
Loyola University Chicago alumni
John Marshall Law School (Chicago) alumni
Illinois Republicans
County officials in Illinois
County commissioners in Illinois
State treasurers of Illinois
People murdered in Illinois
Male murder victims
20th-century American politicians
Military personnel from Illinois
Deaths by strangulation in the United States